Cyclic ozone is a theoretically predicted form of ozone.  Like ordinary ozone (O3), it would have three oxygen atoms.  It would differ from ordinary ozone in how those three oxygen atoms are arranged.  In ordinary ozone, the atoms are arranged in a bent line; in cyclic ozone, they would form an equilateral triangle.

Some of the properties of cyclic ozone have been predicted theoretically.  It should have more energy than ordinary ozone.

There is evidence that tiny quantities of cyclic ozone exist at the surface of  magnesium oxide crystals in air.  Cyclic ozone has not been made in bulk, although at least one researcher has attempted to do so using lasers. Another possibility to stabilize this form of oxygen is to produce it inside confined spaces, e.g., fullerene.

It has been speculated that, if cyclic ozone could be made in bulk, and if it proved to have good stability properties, it could be added to liquid oxygen to improve the specific impulse of rocket fuel.

Currently, the possibility of cyclic ozone is confirmed within diverse theoretical approaches.

References

External links

Allotropes of oxygen
Hypothetical chemical compounds
Cyclic compounds
Three-membered rings
Homonuclear triatomic molecules